Ron Wells may refer to:

Ron Wells (American football) (born 1961), American football player
Ron Wells (politician) (born 1935), Australian politician